North Chicago Community High School, also known as North Chicago and NCCHS, is a public four-year high school located in North Chicago, Illinois, a northern suburb of Chicago, in the United States. It is part of North Chicago School District 187. Due to its proximity to the Naval Station Great Lakes, the school serves military families, resulting in a slightly higher than average mobility rate.

History
The North Chicago Community High School, commonly called NCCHS the school's attendees, was established in 1954.  Before this facility was erected, high school students had to attend the Waukegan High School in the neighboring city of Waukegan, Illinois.  The current North Chicago High School is a  facility with a 750-seat auditorium, library, fine arts facilities, 450-seat cafeteria, two gyms, and a chemistry lab built in 1997. The high school serves approximately 754 students in the North Chicago and Great Lakes area.

Academics

North Chicago High School has h a number of Advanced Placement (AP) and Honors courses available to students. The school also has three guidance counselors as well as a university and college counselor available to students. The school is also a member of the Lake County High Schools Tech Campus at the College of Lake County (CLC), which offers career-based college level training to aspiring high school students, while also broadening their exposure to other students and internship opportunities in Lake County, Illinois. This program has been praised for its academic viability and because students have the opportunity to earn three credits (toward both high school and college) for one class during a two-hour period during their school day.

Various colleges, such as Northwestern University and Robert Morris University make regular visits to North Chicago to attract college-bound students. The school is also home to the North Chicago branch of the I Have a Dream Foundation, which recruits a special group of high achieving students from the grade school level and moves on with them through high school, helping them to complete difficult school work, make important college decisions, and plan their future. The average class size is 14.6, with the number of enrolled students in 2010 was recorded at 916. Culture improvements include, implementation of a new student advisory board and volunteer service requirements for graduation.

North Chicago hosted a series of restructuring meetings, community members working together to implement effective positive changes.
Recently there has been a turnover of principals and a tightening of school rules and policies as mandated by the District 187 Board of Education and the state of Illinois.

Athletics
North Chicago competes in the Northern Lake County Conference and Illinois High School Association. Its mascot is the Warhawks. Various sports are open to participating students during the fall, spring, and winter sports seasons: 1) Fall- Boys football, boys and girls cross country, girls tennis, and girls volleyball and boys soccer; 2) Winter- Boys and girls basketball, girls bowling, and boys and girls wrestling; 3) Spring- Boys and girls track and field, girls soccer, boys volleyball, and boys tennis. There is a long-standing friendly rivalry between North Chicago High School and the neighboring city of Zion-Benton Township High School.

Activities
National Honor Society
Cheerleading
Individual Events (Speech Team)
Concert band / Marching band 
Choir
Scholastic Bowl
Student Council
Science Club
Fellowship of Christian Athletes
NJROTC
Performing Arts

Notable alumni
 Terry Link, Illinois State Senator.
 Tyrone Smith – Professional Long Jumper, 2008 Olympian
 Tiffany Brooks (designer) – HGTV Design Star Winner, Host of "Most Embarrassing Rooms in America
 Thaddeus Coleman, professional football player.
 O'Brien Schofield, football Wisconsin Badgers, NFL player
 Michael Turner, All-Pro NFL running back.

Notable staff
 Guy Curtright was the school's athletic director and baseball coach from its opening in 1954 until 1972. He was a former MLB player with the Chicago White Sox.
 Glen Kozlowski was the school's head football coach.  He is a former NFL wide receiver (1987–92), having played his entire career for the Chicago Bears.

References

External links

 Official website

Public high schools in Illinois
North Chicago, Illinois
Schools in Lake County, Illinois